Michael Grant (born March 13, 1963) is an American college basketball coach for Allen University. He was also most recently the head coach for Coppin State University. He was also a graduate assistant at the University of Michigan where he helped coach his younger brother Gary Grant.

Grant was fired as Coppin State coach on March 20, 2017, after compiling a three-year record of 25–69.

Division I head coaching record

References

1963 births
Living people
Allegheny Gators men's basketball coaches
American men's basketball coaches
American men's basketball players
Basketball coaches from Ohio
Basketball players from Ohio
Cleveland State Vikings men's basketball coaches
College men's basketball head coaches in the United States
College men's basketball players in the United States
Coppin State Eagles men's basketball coaches
Kentucky State Thorobreds basketball coaches
Malone University alumni
Michigan Wolverines men's basketball coaches
Southern Jaguars basketball coaches
Toledo Rockets men's basketball coaches